Assassination, the murder of an opponent or well-known public figure, is one of the oldest tools of power struggles, as well as the expression of certain psychopathic disorders. It dates back to the earliest governments and tribal structures of the world.

Ancient history 
The Egyptian pharaoh Teti is thought to be the earliest known victim of assassination. Between 550 BC and 330 BC, seven Persian kings of Achaemenid Dynasty were murdered. The Art of War, a 5th century BC Chinese military treatise mentions tactics of Assassination and its merits.

Chanakya (c. 350–283 BC), an Indian teacher, philosopher and royal advisor, wrote about assassinations in detail in his political treatise Arthashastra. His student Chandragupta Maurya, the founder of the Maurya Empire of India, later made use of assassinations against some of his enemies, including two of Alexander's generals Nicanor and Philip.

Towards the end of the Warring States period (3rd century BC) in China, the state Qin rose to hegemony over other states. The Prince of the state Yan felt the threat and sought to remove the Qin king (later Qin Shi Huang) and sent Jing Ke for the mission. The assassination attempt was foiled and Jing Ke was killed on the spot.

The Old Testament story of Judith illustrates how a woman frees the Israelites by tricking and assassinating Holofernes, the war-leader of the enemy Assyrians with whom the Israelites were at war.

Philip II of Macedon, the father of Alexander the Great, can be viewed as a victim of assassination. It is a fact, however, that by the fall of the Roman Republic assassination had become a commonly-employed tool towards the end not only of improving one's own position, but to influence policy—the killing of Gaius Julius Caesar being a notable example, though many Emperors met such an end. In whatever case, there seems to have not been a good deal of moral indignation at the practice amongst the political circles of the time, save, naturally, by the affected.

Roman history 
Some of the most famous assassinations in history have taken place in the Roman Empire. Many of these assassinations were for political gain, like that of Gaius Julius Caesar.

Julius Caesar was one of the three leaders of the First Triumvirate of the Roman Republic. After the other two members of the Triumvirate died, Julius Caesar became so popular he was proclaimed 'Dictator for Life', but the senate of the Roman Republic saw this as the end of the Republic, so, on the Ides of March (March 15) of 44 BC, the Roman Senate, including Marcus Junius Brutus the Younger who was a friend of Caesar went to the Senate, and when Caesar arrived, they stabbed him to death. When he was dying, Caesar is said to have looked at Brutus and said "Kaì sú, téknon" (meaning "You too, child"). Soon after this, the Second Triumvirate was formed, ending in the collapse of the Roman Republic and the creation of the Roman Empire by Augustus Caesar.

Another Roman assassination was that of Caligula, the great-grandson of Augustus Caesar. He was overthrown by the military, had his head cut off, and was soon replaced by Claudius. There were many other, less important assassinations, and many more attempted assassinations, but none that had much meaning in the formation and history of the Roman Empire.

One of the earliest accounts of a historical assassination society were the Jewish sicarii in 6 A.D. during the Roman occupation of Israel. This group performed high-risk assassinations of Roman military individuals and other Jewish countrymen who have sided with them, with the use of daggers hidden in cloaks, sometimes performed in broad daylight before disappearing in the crowd. One of their most infamous assassination was that of Jonathan the High Priest. 

Their name comes from the latin word sica, a type of dagger. To this day sicario (plural sicari) means "hit man" or "assassin" in Italian.

The Middle Ages 
As the Middle Ages came about from the fall of the Western Roman Empire, the moral and ethical dimensions of what was before a simple political tool began to take shape.

Although in that period intentional regicide was an extremely rare occurrence, the situation changed dramatically with the Renaissance when the ideas of tyrannomachy (i.e. killing of a King when his rule becomes tyrannical) re-emerged and gained recognition. Several European monarchs and other leading figures were assassinated during religious wars or by religious opponents, for example Henry III and Henry IV of France, and the Protestant Dutch leader, William the Silent. There were also many unsuccessful assassination plots against rulers such as Elizabeth I of England by religious opponents. 

Assassinations also became part of the religious arena as well. For example, Thomas Becket was promoted to the position of Archbishop of Canterbury by King Henry II of England because Becket was part of the King's personal counsel and was also a major supporter of the King's claims on French land. Unfortunately, Becket did not like his new position and found support with the Pope Alexander III, so when Henry sought Becket's support for a lessened Papal grip on England, Becket refused and supported the Church and the Pope. Henry II didn't outright call for Thomas Becket's assassination after this point, but he is reported to have said, "Will no one rid me of this turbulent priest?" As a result, Becket was assassinated by four knights: Reginald Fitzurse, Hugh de Morville, Lord of Westmorland, William de Tracy, and Richard le Breton.

The Hashshashin, a Muslim group in the Middle Ages-Middle East, was well known for performing assassinations in the style of close combat. The word assassin was derived from the name of their group. In Feudal Japan, ninjas or shinobis were hired from both the aristocracy and the peasantry to spy on enemy factions, perform arsonism and disruptions, as well as infiltrating and assassinations.

Modern history

Pre-World War I 
As the world moved into the present day and the stakes in political clashes of will continued to grow to a global scale, the number of assassinations concurrently multiplied. In Russia alone, five emperors were assassinated within less than 200 years – Ivan VI, Peter III, Paul I, Alexander II and Nicholas II (along with his family: his wife, Alexandra; daughters Olga, Tatiana, Maria and Anastasia, and son Alexei). In the United Kingdom, only one Prime Minister of the United Kingdom has ever been assassinated—Spencer Perceval on May 11, 1812.

The most notable assassination victim within early U.S. history was President Abraham Lincoln. Three other U.S. Presidents have been killed by assassination: James Garfield, William McKinley, and John F. Kennedy.  Presidents Andrew Jackson, Franklin D. Roosevelt, Harry S. Truman, Gerald Ford, and Ronald Reagan survived significant assassination attempts (FDR while President-elect, the others while in office). Former President Theodore Roosevelt was shot and wounded during the 1912 presidential campaign. During the Lincoln assassination, there were also attacks planned against current Vice-president Andrew Johnson and Secretary of State William H. Seward, but Johnson's did not go through, and Seward survived the attack. An assassination plot against Jefferson Davis, known as the Dahlgren Affair, may have been initiated during the American Civil War.

In Europe the assassination of Archduke Franz Ferdinand by Gavrilo Princip, one of several Serb nationalist insurgents, triggered World War I. Archduke Franz Ferdinand was visiting Bosnia-Herzegovina, since it was newly annexed to the Austro-Hungarian Empire. He had a route through the city streets of Sarajevo, Bosnia, but was redirected to a back alley. He changed his course and as he was led around the corner out of the back alley and back onto the main street, Gavrilo Princip shot Franz Ferdinand and his wife (Sophie, Duchess of Hohenberg). This assassination brought the Austro-Hungarian Empire into a state of outrage and therefore, World War I was triggered.

Post-World War I 
However, the 20th century probably marks the first time nation-states began training assassins to be specifically used against so-called enemies of the state. During World War II, for example, MI6 trained a group of Czechoslovakian operatives to kill the Nazi general Reinhard Heydrich (who did later perish by their efforts – see Operation Anthropoid), and repeated attempts were made by both the British MI6, the American Office of Strategic Services (later the Central Intelligence Agency) and the Soviet SMERSH to kill Adolf Hitler, who was in fact nearly killed in a bomb plot by a group of his own officers.

India's "Father of the Nation", Mohandas K. Gandhi, was shot and killed on January 30, 1948 by Nathuram Godse, for what Godse perceived as his betrayal of the Hindu cause in attempting to seek peace between Hindus and Muslims.

Cold War and beyond 

The Cold War saw a dramatic increase in the number of political assassinations, likely due to the ideological polarization of most of the First and Second worlds, whose adherents were more than willing to both justify and finance such killings. During the Kennedy era, Fidel Castro had narrowly escaped death several times at the hands of the CIA (a function of the agency's "executive action" program) and CIA-backed rebels (there are accounts that exploding shoes and poisoned clams were employed); some allege that Salvador Allende of Chile was another example, though the specific proof is lacking. The assassination of the FBI agent Dan Mitrione, a well-known teacher of torture techniques, in the hands of the Uruguay a guerrilla movement Tupamaros is a perfect proof of United States intervention in Latin American governments during the Cold War. At the same time, the KGB made creative use of assassination to deal with high-profile defectors such as Georgi Markov, and Israel's Mossad made use of such tactics to eliminate Palestinian guerrillas, politicians and revolutionaries, though some Israelis argue that the targeted often crossed the line between one or another or were even all three.

Most major powers were not long in repudiating such tactics, for example during the presidency of Gerald Ford in the United States in 1976 (Executive Order 12333, which proscription was relaxed however by the George W. Bush administration). Many allege, however, that this is merely a smokescreen for the political and moral benefit and that the covert and illegal training of assassins by major intelligence agencies continue, such as at the School of the Americas run by the United States. In fact, the debate over the use of such tactics is not closed by any means; many accuse Russia of continuing to practice it in Chechnya and against Chechens abroad, as well as Israel in Palestine and against Palestinians abroad (as well as that Mossad deems a threat to Israeli national security, as in the aftermath of the Munich Massacre during "Operation Wrath of God"). Besides, Palestine Liberation Organization members assassinated abroad, Tsahal has also often targeted Hamas in the Gaza strip.

Terrorist organizations will frequently target other combatants as well as non-combatants in their efforts, a prime example was the assassination of Irish solicitor Patrick Finucane who was murdered by the loyalist Ulster Defence Association in 1989 in Belfast, Northern Ireland.

New technology has made targeted killing easier to accomplish remotely, including high precision cruise missiles and combat drones.

Country-specific

In the Israeli–Palestinian conflict 

In the course of the Israeli–Palestinian conflict, the Israel Defense Forces (IDF) employed what they call "focused foiling" ( sikul memukad), or targeted killing, against those suspected by Israel of intending to perform a specific act of violence in the very near future, or to be linked indirectly with several acts of violence (organizing, planning, researching means of destruction, etc.), thus raising the likelihood that his or her killing would foil similar activities in the future. Usually, such strikes have been carried out by Israeli Air Force attack helicopters that fire guided missiles at the target, after the Shin Bet supplies intelligence for the target.

Related controversies 
The exact nature of said proof in focused foiling is controversial and classified, as it involves clandestine military intelligence oriented means and operational decisions made by intelligence officers and commanders rather than being a part of a published justice system executed by lawyers and judges.

The IDF says that targeted killings are only pursued to prevent future terrorism acts, not as revenge for past activities. It also says that this practice is only used when there is absolutely no practical way of foiling the future acts by other means (e.g., arrest), with minimal risk to the soldiers or civilians. It also says that the practice is only used when there is a certainty in the identification of the target, in order to minimize harm to innocent bystanders. The IDF deliberations about the killings remain secret. Moreover, actual injury and death of innocent bystanders remains a claim by opponents of these targeted killings.

Defenders of this practice point out that it is in accordance with the Fourth Geneva Convention (Part 3, Article 1, Section 28), which reads: "The presence of a protected person may not be used to render certain points or areas immune from military operations," and so they argue that international law explicitly gives Israel the right to conduct military operations against military targets under these circumstances.

Israeli public support 
Targeted killings are largely supported by Israeli society to various extents, but there are exceptions: In 2003, 27 IAF Air Force pilots sent a letter of protest to Air Force commander Dan Halutz, refusing to attack targets within Palestinian population centers, and saying that the mistreatment of the Palestinians "morally corrupts the fabric of Israeli society". The letter, the first of its kind emanating from the Air Force, evoked a storm of political protest in Israel, with most circles condemning it as dereliction of duty. IDF ethics forbid soldiers from making public political affiliations, and subsequently the IDF chief of staff announced that all the signatories would be suspended from flight duty, after which some of the pilots recanted and removed their signature.

Well-known Israeli operations 
Some of the best-known targeted killings by Israeli military were Hamas leaders Salah Shahade (July 2002), Sheikh Ahmed Yassin (March 2004), Abdel Aziz al-Rantissi (April 2004), and Adnan al-Ghoul (October 2004). While the term "targeted killing" is mostly used within the context of the Al-Aqsa Intifada by airborne attacks, Israeli security forces have reportedly killed top Palestinians in the past, although this was never confirmed officially.

Some of the best-known operations include:
 Operation Wrath of God against Black September, perpetrators of the 1972 Munich massacre
 Operation Spring of Youth against top PLO leaders in Beirut, Lebanon, 1973
 Abu Jihad (Fatah) in Tunis, 1988
 Fathi Shaqaqi (Palestinian Islamic Jihad) in Malta, 1995
 Yahya Ayyash (Hamas bombmaker, "the engineer") in Gaza, 1996
 Khaled Mashal (Hamas, foiled) in Jordan, 1997
While most killings throughout the course of the Israeli-Palestinian conflict were carried out by the IDF against Palestinian leaders of what Israel says are terror factions, Israeli minister Rehavam Zeevi was assassinated by the Popular Front for the Liberation of Palestine (PFLP), a militant group listed as a terror organization by the U.S. and the EU.

Palestinian attacks and Israeli response 
Palestinian attacks against Israel have been costly for Israel. IDF reports show that from the start of the Second Intifada (in 2000) to 2005, Palestinians killed 1,074 Israelis and wounded 7,520. These are serious figures for such a small country, roughly equivalent to 50,000 dead and 300,000 wounded in the United States over five years.  Such losses generated immense public pressure from the Israeli public for a forceful response, and ramped-up targeted killings were one such outcome.

While Palestinian operations caused substantial damage, there is also evidence that the IDF reprisal targeted killing policy has been salutary in reducing the effectiveness of such attacks. As regarding Hamas, for example, although Hamas attacks increased between 2001 and 2005, Israeli deaths dropped as the people targeted for killing were killed, reduced from a high of 75 in 2001, to 21 in 2005. So even as the total number of Hamas operations climbed, deaths resulting from such attacks plunged, suggesting that the effectiveness of such attacks was being continually weakened.

There are several practical reasons why calculated hits may weaken the effectiveness of terrorist activities. Targeted killings eliminate skilled terrorists, bomb makers, forgers, recruiters and other operatives who need time to develop expertise. The targeted killings also disrupt the opponent's infrastructure, organization, and morale, and cause immense stress on the targets, who must constantly move, switch locations, and hide. This reduces the flow of information in the terrorist organization and reduces its effectiveness. Targeted killings may also serve as a demoralizing agent. Targeted individuals cannot visit their wives, children, relatives, or families without severe risk, and may even avoid their names being made public for fear of being killed. Israeli killings of Hamas leaders Yassin and Rantisi for example, caused Hamas to not publicly identify their replacement, a step necessary to ensure his survival.

Continual diplomatic pressure against the Israeli policy, and the announcement of temporary cease-fires at various times by Hamas are seen by some as further proof of the policy's efficacy. Some observers, however, argue that other factors are at play, including improved intelligence-gathering leading to more arrests, and the construction of the Israeli West Bank barrier which has made it more difficult for terrorists to infiltrate.

United States 
In 1943, the United States military used knowledge from decoded transmissions to carry out a targeted killing of the Japanese Admiral Isoroku Yamamoto.

During the Cold War, the U.S. attempted several times to assassinate Cuban President Fidel Castro.

In 1981, President Ronald Reagan issued Executive Order 12333, which codified a policy first laid down in 1976 by the Ford administration. It stated, "No person employed by or acting on behalf of the United States Government shall engage in, or conspire to engage in, assassination."

In 1986, the American air strikes against Libya included an attack on the barracks where Muammar al-Gaddafi was known to be sleeping. It was claimed that the attack resulted in the death of Gaddafi's infant daughter but reporter Barbara Slavin of USA Today who was in Libya at the time, set the record straight. "His adopted daughter was not killed," she said. "An infant girl was killed. I actually saw her body. She was adopted posthumously by Gadhafi. She was not related to Gadhafi."

During the 1991 Gulf War, the U.S. struck many of Iraq's most important command bunkers with bunker-busting bombs in hopes of killing Iraqi President Saddam Hussein.

Since the rise of al-Qaeda, both the Clinton and Bush administrations have backed "targeted killings." In 1998, in retaliation for the al-Qaeda attacks on U.S. embassies in East Africa, the Clinton administration launched cruise missiles against a training camp in Afghanistan where bin Laden had been hours before. Reportedly, the U.S. nearly killed the leader of the Taliban, Mullah Omar, with a Predator-launched Hellfire missile on the first night of Operation Enduring Freedom. In May 2002, the CIA launched a Hellfire missile from a Predator drone in an effort to kill the Afghan warlord Gulbuddin Hekmatyar.

On November 3, 2002, a US Central Intelligence Agency-operated MQ-1 Predator unmanned aerial vehicle (UAV) fired a Hellfire missile that destroyed a car carrying six suspected al-Qaeda operatives in Yemen. The target of the attack was Qaed Salim Sinan al-Harethi, the top al-Qaeda operative in Yemen. Among those killed in the attack was a US citizen, Yemeni-American Ahmed Hijazi.

According to Bush administration, the killing of an American in this fashion was legal. "I can assure you that no constitutional questions are raised here. There are authorities that the president can give to officials. He's well within the balance of accepted practice and the letter of his constitutional authority," said Condoleezza Rice, the US national security adviser.

During the press-conference, the US State Department spokesman Richard Boucher said that Washington's reasons for opposing the targeted killings of Palestinians might not apply in other circumstances and denied allegation that by staging the Yemen operation the US may be using double standards towards Israeli policy: "We all understand the situation with regard to Israeli–Palestinian issues and the prospects of peace and the prospects of negotiation ... and of the need to create an atmosphere for progress. ... A lot of different things come into play there. ... Our policy on targeted killings in the Israeli-Palestinian context has not changed."

On December 3, 2005, the US was blamed for another incident, in which alleged al-Qaeda #3 man (operations chief Abu Hamza Rabia) was reportedly killed in Pakistan by an airborne missile, together with four associates. However, Pakistani officials claim the group was killed while preparing explosives, not from any targeted military operation., The US has made no official comment about the incident.

The attack targeted Ayman al-Zawahiri who was thought to be in the village. Pakistani officials later said that al-Zawahiri was not there and that the U.S. had acted on faulty intelligence.

On June 7, 2006, US Forces dropped one laser-guided bomb and one GPS-guided bomb on a safehouse north of Baqubah, Iraq, where Al-Qaeda in Iraq leader Abu Musab al-Zarqawi was believed to be meeting with several aides.  His death was confirmed the next day.

On May 2, 2011, Osama bin Laden, the founder of the militant Islamist organization al-Qaeda, was killed by gunshot wounds in a raid by United States special operations forces on his safe house in Bilal Town, Abbottabad, Pakistan.

Modern India 
India saw assassination – Mahatma Gandhi on 30 January 1948 by one Nathuram Godse, Gandhi's acceptance of India's partition into India and Pakistan and rejection of Hindu nationalism being the prime causes of Godse's action.

India's third Prime minister – Indira Gandhi was assassinated in 1984 by Sikh Extremists in retaliation at her decision to storm the Golden Temple in Amritsar.

Her son Rajiv Gandhi too met his end when he was assassinated by the LTTE in 1991.

Russia (post-communism) 
Russia employed a similar strategy in the course of its First and Second Chechen Wars, targeting the leaders of the Chechen separatist movement. Chechen President Dzhokhar Dudaev was killed by an air strike of the Russian Air Force on April 21, 1996, and Aslan Maskhadov was killed on March 8, 2005.  On July 10, 2006, Shamil Basayev, the Chechen rebel, was killed in an explosion, though it is unclear if this was an accident in the handling of explosives, or a targeted Russian attack.

In the poisoning of Alexander Litvinenko of 2006, a former KGB officer was murdered in Great Britain by means of the radioactive element polonium-210. Litvinenko had obtained political asylum in Great Britain, and was an outspoken critic of Vladimir Putin and the Russian security services. It was reported that the source of the polonium had been traced to a Russian nuclear power plant, and Russia subsequently refused Britain's request to extradite ex-KGB bodyguard Andrey Lugovoy to face murder charges; Lugovoy was later elected to the Russian State Duma.

References 

Political history